The fourth season of the Mexican television series ¿Quién es la máscara? premiered on Las Estrellas on October 16, 2022. On December 18, 2022, Huacal (singers Karla Díaz-Leal, Melissa López, Regina Murguía and Angie Taddei) was declared the winner, and Alebrije (singer Ana Bárbara) the runner-up.

Panelists and host 

Singer Yuri, singer Carlos Rivera, and social media influencer Juanpa Zurita returned as panelists. Mónica Huarte did not return as a panelist and was replaced by Galilea Montijo. Former host Omar Chaparro returned to the show as host, replacing Adrián Uribe.

Throughout the season, various guest panelists appeared as the fifth panelist in the panel for one episode. These guest panelists included season 3 contestant Carlos Ponce (episode 4), actress Irina Baeva (episode 5), singer Kenia Os (episode 5), and actress Ana Claudia Talancón (episode 6).

Contestants 
In addition to the core group of contestants, the season also features a non-contestant mask "Dr. Veneno" (Dr. Venom) who first appeared in the sixth episode and were ultimately unmasked in the eighth episode as actor Salvador Zerboni.

Episodes

Week 1 (October 16) 
 Guest performance: "La Gozadera" by Gente de Zona ft. Marc Anthony performed by Kalimba, Carlos Rivera and Yuri

Week 2 (October 23)

Week 3 (October 30)

Week 4 (November 6)

Week 5 (November 13)

Week 6 (November 20)

Week 7 (November 27) 
 Guest performance: "Problema" by Timbiriche performed by Dr. Veneno

Week 8 (December 4) 
 Group performance: "I Gotta Feeling" by Black Eyed Peas

Week 9 (December 11)

Week 10 (December 18) 
 Group performance: "Firework" by Katy Perry
 Guest performance: "Reza y Reza" performed by Ana Bárbara

Ratings

Notes

References 

2022 Mexican television seasons
¿Quién es la máscara? (Mexican TV series)